The 80-meter or 3.5 MHz band is a band of radio frequencies allocated for amateur radio use, from 3.5 to 4.0 MHz in IARU Region 2 (consisting mostly of North and South America), and generally 3.5 to 3.8 or 3.9 MHz in Regions 1 and 3 (the rest of the world) respectively. The upper portion of the band, which is usually used for phone (voice), is sometimes referred to as 75 meters. In Europe, 75m is a shortwave broadcast band, with a number of national radio services operating between 3.9 and 4.0 MHz.

Because of high D layer absorption that persists until sunset, 80 meters is usually only good for local communications during the day, and hardly ever good for communications over intercontinental distances during the day. But it is the most popular band for regional communications networks from the late afternoon through the night time hours. At night, "80" is usually reliable for short to medium distance contacts, with average distances ranging from local contacts within 200 miles/300 km out to a distance of 1,000 miles/1,600 km or more – even worldwide – at night, depending on atmospheric and ionospheric conditions.

Summary
The 80-meter band is favoured for ragchews between amateurs within a range of 500 miles/800 km. During contests the band is filled with activity beginning before sunset and continuing all through the night. The 80 meter band begins at 3.5 MHz and goes up to 4.0 MHz. The upper part of the band, mostly used for voice, is often referred to as 75 meters, since the wavelength is between 80 and 75 meters.

Erecting the large antennas and ensuring the antennas radiate significant power at low angles are two of the challenges facing amateurs wishing to communicate over long distances. Amateurs interested in regional communication can use low wire antennas, such as horizontal dipoles, inverted vee dipole antennas or loop antennas on this band. Horizontally polarized antennas closer than a quarter-wave to earth produce predominantly high-angle radiation, which is useful for short-distance propagation modes, such as near vertical incidence skywave. Nonetheless, with occasionally favorable propagation conditions substantial distances can still be covered with modest height antennas.

80 meters can be plagued with noise, with the rural noise floor set by propagated noise from distant thunderstorms and man-made noise sources. Urban and suburban noise floor is often established by local noise, and is generally 10–20 dB stronger than the typical rural noise floor. On 80 meters, nearly all areas of the world are subject to local weather induced noises from thunderstorms.

The ionosphere's D-layer also affects 80 meters significantly by absorbing signals. Global coverage can be routinely achieved during the late fall and winter by a station using modest power and common antennas. The higher background noise on 80 meters, especially when combined with higher ionospheric absorption, causes stations with higher effective radiated power to have a decided advantage in long-distance communications. With very high antennas or large vertically polarized arrays and full legal power, reliable worldwide communications occurs over nighttime paths.
 
Mobile operation is possible, although the relatively short length of practical mobile antennas – usually less than  – compared to a quarter-wave antenna results in the need for significant inductive loading to achieve resonance. Since short antennas have very low radiation resistance, their efficiency is typically below 10%. Additionally, the large inductance of the loading coil creates an antenna system with an extremely narrow bandwidth (high Q).

History

The 80-meter band was made available to amateurs in the United States by the Third National Radio Conference on October 10, 1924. The band was allocated on a worldwide basis by the International Radiotelegraph Conference in Washington, D.C., on October 4, 1927.

Propagation
As the maximum usable frequency for long-distance communication seldom dips below 3.5 MHz anywhere on the planet, the main propagation barrier to long-distance communication is heavy D-layer absorption during the daytime, ensuring that DX paths must be largely, although not entirely, in darkness. At times, there is pronounced dark-side gray-line propagation, which is most useful on polar routes, away from equatorial thunderstorm activity.

At higher latitudes, a noticeable skip zone sometimes appears on the band during nighttime hours in midwinter, which can be as much as 300 miles/500 km, rendering communication with closer stations impossible. This is not generally a problem at middle or equatorial latitudes, or for large parts of the year anywhere, but it does occasionally limit local wintertime traffic on the band in areas such as Northern Europe, the northern tier of the United States and Canada.

During spring and summer (year-round in the tropics), lightning from distant storms creates significantly higher background noise levels, often becoming an insurmountable obstacle to maintaining normal communications. Nearby convective weather activity during the summer months can make the band completely unusable, even for local communications. In the winter months during the peak years of the sunspot cycle, auroral effects can also render the band useless for hours at a time.

Frequency allocation 

The International Telecommunication Union allocated the whole 500 kHz from 3.5 to 4 MHz to amateurs in the Americas, and 3.5 to 3.8 or 3.9 MHz to amateurs in other parts of the world. However, amateurs outside the Americas must share this useful piece of spectrum with other users, usually on a joint primary basis. As a result, authorities in the affected parts of the world restrict amateur allocations between 3.7 MHz and the top of the band.

Some allocations are as follows (in MHz):
 Argentina 3.500–3.750, 3.790–3.800
 Australia 3.500–3.700, 3.776–3.800 (Latter is a DX window for advanced licensees only)
 Canada 3.500–4.000
 Europe 3.500–3.800
 India 3.500–3.700, 3.890–3.900
 Korea 3.500–3.550, 3.790–3.800, (Digital: 3.520 ~ 3.525 MHz)
 Japan  3.500–3.575, 3.599–3.612, 3.680–3.687, 3.702–3.716, 3.745–3.770, 3.791–3.805,
 New Zealand 3.500–3.900
 Russia 3.500–3.800
 United States 3.500–4.000

Lower band edge
The lower edge of 80 meters is predominated by CW emissions, with the lower 10 kHz (3.5–3.51 MHz) primarily used for long-distance communications. It is common for illegal marine operations, generally using USB voice, to occupy frequencies on the low end of 80 meters. Most operations of this type are from fishing vessels. Most come from SE Asia and South American ports, although some illegal use occurs with vessels from USA and Canadian ports.

Upper band edge
For Canadian and U.S. Amateurs with perfect transmitters, the highest usable frequency in the 80 m band for lower side band phone is 3.999 MHz. Depending on quality and condition of radio, audio characteristics, and proper adjustments the bulk of emissions on lower sideband will typically occupy 3.9970–3.9997 MHz. All SSB transceivers have third- and fifth-order products of significant level, typically only 30–35 dB below PEP for third order intermodulation. This means any operation above 3.998 MHz LSB comes with some risk of illegal emissions, even with good equipment.

It is a common misconception that using this carrier frequency is not legal as emissions extend beyond the 4 MHz band edge. High quality communications receivers or selective level meters generally have better dynamic range than all but the best spectrum analyzers. Properly used, they do an excellent job of indicating out-of-band emissions. While some people reporting out-of-band operation might use a wide receiver bandwidth, receiver bandwidth adds to transmitter bandwidth, so the perception is bandwidth is wider than it truly is. Any measurement of out-of-band emissions should be made using a receiver bandwidth significantly narrower than the transmitter bandwidth.

Inexpensive spectrum analyzers, spectrum scopes, or panadaptors are generally not useful for off-air measurements of bandwidth. Wide detection bandwidth, slow sweep rates, and commonly high local ambient noise levels generally mask weaker emissions. Using other phone modes such as upper side band, amplitude or frequency modulation with 3.999 MHz as the carrier frequency would modulate across the band edge and are not considered legal. Certain data modes and CW are usable as long as the emission bandwidth does not extend across the band edge.

Broadcast interference
The European 75 m broadcast band overlaps the North American 80 m ham band allocation. When it is night on both ends of the transmission path some broadcasters in Asia and Europe can be heard in North America between 3.9 and 4.0 MHz. On an SSB receiver this produces a tone in the received audio when the station is broadcasting with conventional amplitude modulation or white noise if the station is using Digital Radio Mondiale modulation. Setting the receiver to the exact frequency of the AM carrier can eliminate the tone but an audio program may still be heard. If the DRM signal is strong enough the noise may mask weak amateur signals. Most DRM signals occupy 9 or 10 kHz of bandwidth.

See also
Shortwave bands

References

Amateur radio bands